The 1956 Grand National was the 110th renewal of the Grand National horse race that took place at Aintree near Liverpool, England, on 24 March 1956.

It is probably best remembered for Devon Loch's sudden and inexplicable fall on the final straight, just 40 yards from a certain victory. The incident is almost always replayed during television build-up coverage on Grand National day.

Owned by Queen Elizabeth The Queen Mother and ridden by Dick Francis, the well-fancied Devon Loch held a five-length lead over his nearest challenger, E.S.B., on the run-in to the finishing post, when he suddenly half-jumped into the air and landed in a bellyflop on his stomach, allowing E.S.B. to overtake and win. Although Francis tried to cajole the horse, it was unable to continue.

Finishing order

Non-finishers

Media Coverage and Aftermath
Aintree maintained a refusal to allow the race to be broadcast either live or delayed by any Television company, the BBC having submitted a request every year since 1946. However, The BBC's rights to broadcast the race live on radio remained in place, making this the twenty-fifth consecutive live coverage of the race since 1927. The race was broadcast live on the BBC Light Programme from 3pm with Raymond Glendenning calling in the winner while Michael O'Hehir and Peter O'Sullevan called the action out in the country. Claude Harrison, Bob Haynes, and Aubrey Renwick assisted by calling competitors that dropped out of the race. As per all previous years, part of the agreement to broadcast was that the copyright for the recording would be held by Tophams and not the BBC.

E.S.B.'s jockey Dave Dick said of his unexpected win: "Devon Loch had me stone cold. I was a terribly lucky winner." Devon Loch's owner Queen Elizabeth The Queen Mother famously said of the incident: "Oh, that's racing!" For jockey Dick Francis, his mount's bizarre collapse on the run-in to victory in the world's most famous steeplechase remained a "terrible memory, even after all these years." Devon Loch's was not the first time a horse had seemed to jump some form of ghost fence on the run in of the National. In 1901, Arthur Nightingall's race was well won on board Grudon when his mount also made to jump a fence that wasn't there. On that occasion the pair recovered and had sufficient time to continue and win the race.

References

 1956
Grand National
Grand National
Grand National
20th century in Lancashire